Mihael Preiss  was a politician of the early 17th century in Slovenia when the country was under the Holy Roman Empire. He became mayor of Ljubljana in 1605.
He was succeeded by Janez Vodapiuez in 1607.

References

Year of birth missing
Year of death missing
17th-century Carniolan people
Mayors of places in the Holy Roman Empire
Mayors of Ljubljana
Carniolan politicians